FM S.H.E is the ninth studio album by Taiwanese Mandopop girl group S.H.E. It was released on 23 September 2008 by HIM International Music in two editions: FM S.H.E (Retro Radio Edition) (我的電台 復古電台版) and FM S.H.E (Future Radio Edition) (我的電台 未來電台版) which contains a bonus DVD with two music videos and behind-the-scene footage.

The album contains 12 tracks and members of the group take on the persona of radio hosts, which is interspersed with three radio station-esque snippets. The track "安静了" (It's Quiet Now), with lyrics rewritten by Selina, is a cover of "安靜" (Silence) by Taiwanese artist Jay Chou, which was released in his second album Fantasy.

From December 2007 to September 2008, the music video for "宇宙小姐" (Miss Universe) was the year's 5th most popular music video, having been requested over 32 million times.

Reception
The album debuted at number one on Taiwan's G-Music Top 20 Weekly Mandarin and Combo Charts, and Five Music Chart at week 38 (19 to 25 September 2008) with a percentage sales of 35.81%, 17.9% and 25.18% respectively.

The tracks "安静了" (It's Quiet Now), "宇宙小姐" (Miss Universe) and "沿海公路的出口" (Coastal Highway Exit) are listed at number 14, 68 and 84 respectively on Hit Fm Taiwan's Hit Fm Annual Top 100 Singles Chart (Hit-Fm年度百首單曲) for 2008.

The track, "安静了" (It's Quiet Now) won one of the Top 10 Songs of the Year at the 2009 HITO Radio Music Awards presented by Taiwanese radio station Hit FM.

The album was awarded one of the Top 10 Selling Mandarin Albums of the Year at the 2008 IFPI Hong Kong Album Sales Awards, presented by the Hong Kong branch of IFPI.

Track listing

Bonus DVD
FM S.H.E (Future Radio Edition)
 Cover photoshoot behind-the-scene
 "宇宙小姐" (Miss Universe) MV behind-the-scene
 "宇宙小姐" (Miss Universe) MV
 "酸甜" (Sweet and Sour) MV behind-the-scene
 "酸甜" (Sweet and Sour) MV

Music videos
 "沿海公路的出口" (Coastal Highway Exit) MV - co-stars Ella and Eddie Peng and directed by Chu Yu-ning (瞿友寧). It is about a girl whose boyfriend died due to a sea accident. The girl fell in love with another boy with similar traits as her ex, only to find out that he only treats her as a friend and he already have a girlfriend.
 "安静了" (It's Quiet Now) MV - co-star Selina and Ethan Juan. Who plays a couple breaking up.

Charts

Notes

References

External links
  S.H.E discography@HIM International Music

2008 albums
S.H.E albums
HIM International Music albums